SS Chenab was a  steamship built for the Nourse Line in 1911 by Cammell Laird and Company Limited of Birkenhead in England. 

She had a 425 NHP triple expansion steam engine driving a single screw.

Like other Nourse Line ships, she was primarily used for the transportation of Indian indentured labourers to the colonies. Details of some of these voyages are as follows:

Chenab was sold in 1930 to the Khedivial Mail Line of Alexandria, and in 1931 resold to the Cie de Navigation Libano-Syrienne of Beirut and renamed Ville de Beyrouth. By 1936 she owned by the Societe Orientale de Navigation of Beirut, and in 1939 was renamed Al Rawdah.

In 1940 the ship was requisitioned by the British Ministry of War Transport, serving as  under the management of the British India Steam Navigation Company. Al Rawdah was moored in Strangford Lough near Killyleagh in 1940, and was used as a prison ship for Irish republican internees. By early 1945 Al Rawdah was stationed in Holy Loch being used as an accommodation ship attached to the 3rd Submarine Flotilla. She was returned to the Khedivial Mail Line in 1946, and was finally scrapped at Rosyth in 1953.

See also
 Indian indenture ships to Fiji
 Indian indenture system

References

External links
 Genealogy.com
 Nourse Line
 Indian Immigrant Ship List
 The Compass

1911 ships
Ships of the Nourse Line
Ships of the British India Steam Navigation Company
Ships built on the River Mersey
History of British Guiana
History of Suriname
Indian indentureship in Trinidad and Tobago
Indian indenture ships to Fiji
Prison ships